The global temperature record shows the fluctuations of the temperature of the atmosphere and the oceans through various spans of time. There are numerous estimates of temperatures since the end of the Pleistocene glaciation, particularly during the current Holocene epoch. Some temperature information is available through geologic evidence, going back millions of years. More recently, information from ice cores covers the period from 800,000 years before the present time until now. A study of the paleoclimate covers the time period from 12,000 years ago to the present. Tree rings and measurements from ice cores can give evidence about the global temperature from 1,000-2,000 years before the present until now. The most detailed information exists since 1850, when methodical thermometer-based records began.

Geologic evidence (millions of years) 

On longer time scales, sediment cores show that the cycles of glacials and interglacials are part of a deepening phase within a prolonged ice age that began with the glaciation of Antarctica approximately 40 million years ago.  This deepening phase, and the accompanying cycles, largely began approximately 3 million years ago with the growth of continental ice sheets in the Northern Hemisphere.  Gradual changes in Earth's climate of this kind have been frequent during the Earth's 4,540 million year existence and most often are attributed to changes in the configuration of continents and ocean sea ways.

Ice cores (from 800,000 years before present) 

Even longer term records exist for few sites: the recent Antarctic EPICA core reaches 800 kyr; many others reach more than 100,000 years. The EPICA core covers eight glacial/interglacial cycles. The NGRIP core from Greenland stretches back more than 100 kyr, with 5 kyr in the Eemian interglacial. Whilst the large-scale signals from the cores are clear, there are problems interpreting the detail, and connecting the isotopic variation to the temperature signal.

Ice core locations 

The World Paleoclimatology Data Center (WDC) maintains the ice core data files of glaciers and ice caps in polar and low latitude mountains all over the world.

Ice core records from Greenland 
As a paleothermometry, the ice core in central Greenland showed consistent records on the surface-temperature changes.  According to the records, changes in global climate are rapid and widespread. Warming phase only needs simple steps, however, the cooling process requires more prerequisites and bases. Also, Greenland has the clearest record of abrupt climate changes in the ice core, and there are no other records that can show the same time interval with equally high time resolution.

When scientists explored the trapped gas in the ice core bubbles, they found that the methane concentration in Greenland ice core is significantly higher than that in Antarctic samples of similar age, the records of changes of concentration difference between Greenland and Antarctic reveal variation of latitudinal distribution of methane sources. Increase in methane concentration shown by Greenland ice core records implies that the global wetland area has changed greatly over past years. As a component of greenhouse gases, methane plays an important role in global warming. The variation of methane from Greenland records makes a unique contribution for global temperature records undoubtedly.

Ice core records from Antarctica 
The Antarctic ice sheet originated in the late Eocene, the drilling has restored a record of 800,000 years in Dome Concordia, and it is the longest available ice core in Antarctica. In recent years, more and more new studies have provided older but discrete records. Due to the uniqueness of the Antarctic ice sheet, the Antarctic ice core not only records the global temperature changes, but also contains huge quantities of information about the global biogeochemical cycles, climate dynamics and abrupt changes in global climate.

By comparing with current climate records, the ice core records in Antarctica further confirm that polar amplification. Although Antarctica is covered by the ice core records, the density is rather low considering the area of Antarctica. Exploring more drilling stations is the primary goal for current research institutions.

Ice core records from low-latitude regions 
The ice core records from low-latitude regions are not as common as records from polar regions, however, these records still provide much useful information for scientists. Ice cores in low-latitude regions usually locates in high altitude areas. The Guliya record is the longest record from low-latitude, high altitude regions, which spans over 700,000 years. According to these records, scientists found the evidence which can prove the Last Glacial Maximum (LGM) was colder in the tropics and subtropics than previously believed. Also, the records from low-latitude regions helped scientists confirm that the 20th century was the warmest period in the last 1000 years.

Paleoclimate (from 12,000 years before present) 

Many estimates of past temperatures have been made over Earth's history.  The field of paleoclimatology includes ancient temperature records.  As the present article is oriented toward recent temperatures, there is a focus here on events since the retreat of the Pleistocene glaciers.  The 10,000 years of the Holocene epoch covers most of this period, since the end of the Northern Hemisphere's Younger Dryas millennium-long cooling.  The Holocene Climatic Optimum was generally warmer than the 20th century, but numerous regional variations have been noted since the start of the Younger Dryas.

Tree rings and ice cores (from 1,000-2,000 years before present) 

Proxy measurements can be used to reconstruct the temperature record before the historical period. Quantities such as tree ring widths, coral growth, isotope variations in ice cores, ocean and lake sediments, cave deposits, fossils, ice cores, borehole temperatures, and glacier length records are correlated with climatic fluctuations. From these, proxy temperature reconstructions of the last 2000 years have been performed for the northern hemisphere, and over shorter time scales for the southern hemisphere and tropics.

Geographic coverage by these proxies is necessarily sparse, and various proxies are more sensitive to faster fluctuations. For example, tree rings, ice cores, and corals generally show variation on an annual time scale, but borehole reconstructions rely on rates of thermal diffusion, and small scale fluctuations are washed out. Even the best proxy records contain far fewer observations than the worst periods of the observational record, and the spatial and temporal resolution of the resulting reconstructions is correspondingly coarse. Connecting the measured proxies to the variable of interest, such as temperature or rainfall, is highly non-trivial. Data sets from multiple complementary proxies covering overlapping time periods and areas are reconciled to produce the final reconstructions.

Proxy reconstructions extending back 2,000 years have been performed, but reconstructions for the last 1,000 years are supported by more and higher quality independent data sets. These reconstructions indicate:
 global mean surface temperatures over the last 25 years have been higher than any comparable period since AD 1600, and probably since AD 900
 there was a Little Ice Age centered on AD 1700
 there was a Medieval Warm Period centered on AD 1000, but this was not a global phenomenon.

Indirect historical proxies 

As well as natural, numerical proxies (tree-ring widths, for example) there exist records from the human historical period that can be used to infer climate variations, including: reports of frost fairs on the Thames; records of good and bad harvests; dates of spring blossom or lambing; extraordinary falls of rain and snow; and unusual floods or droughts. Such records can be used to infer historical temperatures, but generally in a more qualitative manner than natural proxies.

Recent evidence suggests that a sudden and short-lived climatic shift between 2200 and 2100 BCE occurred in the region between Tibet and Iceland, with some evidence suggesting a global change.  The result was a cooling and reduction in precipitation.  This is believed to be a primary cause of the collapse of the Old Kingdom of Egypt.

Satellite and balloon (1950s-present)

Weather balloon radiosonde measurements of atmospheric temperature at various altitudes begin to show an approximation of global coverage in the 1950s. Since December 1978, microwave sounding units on satellites have produced data which can be used to infer temperatures in the troposphere.

Several groups have analyzed the satellite data to calculate temperature trends in the troposphere. Both the University of Alabama in Huntsville (UAH) and the private, NASA funded, corporation Remote Sensing Systems (RSS) find an upward trend.

For the lower troposphere, UAH found a global average trend between 1978 and 2019 of 0.130 degrees Celsius per decade.
RSS found a trend of 0.148 degrees Celsius per decade, to January 2011.

In 2004 scientists found trends of +0.19  degrees Celsius per decade when applied to the RSS dataset. Others found 0.20  degrees Celsius per decade up between 1978 and 2005, since which the dataset has not been updated.

Thermometers (1850-present)

See also 

Climate variability and change
Global warming (causing recent climate change)
CLIWOC (climatological database for the world's oceans)
Dendroclimatology

References

External links

 Hadley Centre: Global temperature data
 NASA's Goddard Institute for Space Studies (GISS) — Global Temperature Trends.
 Surface Temperature Reconstructions for the last 2,000 Years

Temperature
History of climate variability and change
Climate and weather statistics